Herblingen railway station is a railway station in the Swiss canton of Schaffhausen and in the former village of Herblingen, which is today part of the city of Schaffhausen. Although the station is in Switzerland, it is located on the Deutsche Bahn's High Rhine railway line that links Basel to Singen.

The station infrastructure has been improved for the opening of LIPO Park Schaffhausen right next to it in 2017.

Services
 the following S-Bahn services stop at Herblingen:

Bus
Line 9 of Verkehrsbetriebe Schaffhausen (vbsh) serves Herblingen railway station.

References

External links
 
 

Railway stations in the canton of Schaffhausen
Swiss Federal Railways stations